Carol Ann or Carol-Ann is a blended name combining Carol and Ann that is an English and German feminine given name derived from the names Karl and Hannah. Notable people referred to by this name include the following:

Given name

Known as Carol Ann or Carol-Ann

Carol Ann Abrams (1942 – 2012), American television and film producer, author and academic
Carol Ann Carter (born 1947), American artist
Carol Ann Cole (1963 – 1980), American murder victim
Carol Ann Conboy (born 1947), American jurist
Carol Ann Drazba (1943 – 1966), American Army nurse
Carol Ann Duffy (born 1955), British poet and playwright
Carol Ann Duthie (1937 — 2001), Canadian water skier
Carol Ann Heavey (fl. 1984) Irish swimmer
Carol-Ann James, West Indian cricketer
Carol Ann Lee (born 1969), English author and biographer
Carol Ann Mooney, American academic
Carol Ann Peters (born 1932), American figure skater
Carol-Ann Schindel, American politician
Carol Ann Shudlick Smith, American basketball player
Carol Ann Susi (1952 – 2014), American actress
Carol Ann Tomlinson, American educator, author and speaker
Carol Ann Toupes (1936 – 2004), American triplet
Carol Ann Whitehead, Royal Society of Arts Fellow

Known as Carol

Carol Ann Alt, known as Carol Alt (born 1960), American model and actress
Carol Ann Bartz, known as Carol Bartz (born 1948), American business executive
Carol Ann Marie Bassett, known as Carol A.M. Bassett, Bermudian politician
Carol Ann Beaumont, known as Carol Beaumont, (born 1960), New Zealand politician
Carol Ann Blazejowski, known as Carol Blazejowski (born 1956), American basketball player
Carol Ann Bower, known as Carol Bower (born 1956), American rower
Carol Ann Burns, known as Carol Burns (1947 – 2015), Australian actress and theatre director 
Carol Ann Campbell, known as Carol Campbell (politician), (?? – 2008), American politician
Carol Ann Christian, known as Carol Christian, (born 1950) is an American astronomer and science communicator
Carol Ann Corrigan, known as Carol Corrigan (born 1948), American jurist
Carol Ann Crawford, known as Carol Crawford (1934 – 1982)
Carol Ann Decker, known as Carol Decker (born 1957), English musician and lead vocalist for T'Pau
Carol Ann DiBattiste, known as Carol A. DiBattiste (born 1951), American lawyer, administrator and executive
Carol Ann Doda, known as Carol Doda (1937 – 2015), American adult entertainer
Carol Ann Fowler, known as Carol Fowler, American experimental psychologist
Carol Ann Heyer, known as Carol Heyer (born February 2, 1950)[1] is an American illustrator and children's writer
Carol Ann Hovenkamp-Grow, known as Carol Grow (born 1971), American beauty queen, model and actress
Carol Ann Judge, known as Carol Judge, (1941 – 2014), American healthcare advocate
Carol Ann Lloyd, born as Carol Ann Cramb and known as Carol Lloyd, (1948–2017), Australian singer, songwriter, and composer
Carol Ann Laverne Morris, known as Carol Morris (born 1936), American actress, model and beauty queen (Miss Universe 1956)
Carol Ann Peterka, known as Carol Peterka  (born 1963), American handball player
Carol Ann Rymer Davis, known as Carol Rymer Davis, (1944 – 2010), American balloonist, and radiologist
Carol Ann Shields, known as Carol Shields (1935 – 2003), American-born novelist and short story writer
Carol Ann Colclough Strickland, known as Carol Strickland (born 1946), American art historian
Carol Ann Windley, known as Carol Windley, (born 1947), Canadian short story writer and novelist
Carol Ann Yager, known as Carol Yager (1960 – 1994), extremely obese American

Known by another name
Carol Ann Surasky, maiden name of Chana Timoner (born 1951), American rabbi and military officer
Carol Ann Holness, known by stage name Nancy Nova, English singer and songwriter
Carol Ann Wells, known as Annie Wells (born 1972), Scottish politician

Fictional character
Carol Ann, character from Mommie Dearest (film)

See also

Caril Ann Fugate
Carol Anne
Carolan (disambiguation)
Carole Ann

Notes

English feminine given names
German feminine given names